Jacques Roumain (June 4, 1907 – August 18, 1944) was a Haitian writer, politician, and advocate of Marxism. He is considered one of the most prominent figures in Haitian literature. The African-American poet, Langston Hughes, translated some of Roumain's works, including Gouverneurs de la Rosée (Masters of the Dew).

Life 
Roumain was born on June 4, 1907, in Port-au-Prince to wealthy parents. His grandfather, Tancrède Auguste, served as the President of Haiti from 1912 to 1913. He was educated in Catholic schools in Port-au-Prince, and, later, in Belgium, Switzerland, France, Germany and Spain. At twenty years old, he returned to Haiti and formed La Revue Indigene: Les Arts et La Vie (The Indigenous Review: Arts and Life), along with Philippe Thoby-Marcelin, Carl Brouard, and Antonio Vieux.

He was active in the struggle against the United States' occupation of Haiti. In 1934 he founded the Haitian Communist Party. Because of some of his political activities, his participation in the resistance movement against the United States' occupation, and most notably, his creation of the Haitian Communist Party, he was often arrested and finally exiled by then President Sténio Vincent.

During his years in exile, Roumain worked with and befriended many prominent pan-African writers and poets of the time, including Langston Hughes. During this time he was also affiliated with Columbia University in New York City, where he conducted ethnographical research. With a change in government in Haiti, Roumain was allowed to return to his native country. Upon returning, he founded the Office of Ethnology. In 1943, President Élie Lescot appointed him chargé d'affaires in Mexico, where his newly found creative freedom permitted him to complete two of his most influential books, the poetry collection Bois D'ébène (Ebony Wood) and the novel, Gouverneurs de la Rosée (Masters of the Dew). He also published that year the seminal paper "Lithic Workshop of the Ciboney of Haiti," and as a result was regarded as the father of Haitian archaeology.

Much of Roumain's work expresses the frustration and rage of people who have been downtrodden for centuries. He included the mass of the people in his writing and called on the poor union to move against privation.

Death and legacy 

On August 18, 1944, Jacques Roumain, one of Haiti's most respected and complex writers, died of still unknown causes at age 37. Roumain created some of the most colorful, dynamic, and moving poetry of his generation. His writings continue to influence and shape Haitian culture and the pan-African world of today.

By the time of his death, Roumain had become an acclaimed writer in the Caribbean, Latin America, and Europe. His great novel, Gouverneurs de la Rosée, has achieved a permanent place among great Caribbean and Latin American literature. It is a novel that is still studied at universities, read by new generations, and acted out by theatrical groups.

Quotes 
What are we? Since that's your question, I'm going to answer you. We're this country, and it wouldn't be a thing without us, nothing at all. Who does the planting? Who does the watering? Who does the harvesting? Coffee, cotton, rice, sugar cane, caco, corn, bananas, vegetables, and all the fruits, who's going to grow them if we don't? Yet with all that, we're poor, that's true. We're out of luck, that's true. We're miserable, that's true. But do you know why, brother? Because of our ignorance. We don't know yet what a force we are, what a single force - all the peasants, all the Negroes of the plain and hill, all united. Some day, when we get wise to that, we'll rise up from one end of the country to the other. Then we'll call a General Assembly of the Masters of the Dew, a great big coumbite of farmers and we'll clear out poverty and plant a new life. --"Masters of the Dew", p. 106

Selected works 
From the collection of the Library of Congress, Washington, DC:
 "Oeuvres Complètes", Léon-François Hoffman, Ed.  ALLCA XX (Coll. Archivos), Paris, 2003.
A propos de la campagne "anti-superstitieuse". Port-au-Prince, Impr. de l’État [1944?]
Analyse schématique 1932-1934. [Haiti]: Editions idées nouvelles, idées prolétariennes, 1999.
Bois-d’ébène. Port-au-Prince, Haiti: Imp. H. Deschamps [c1945]
Ebony wood. Bois-d’ébène. Poems. The French text with a translation by Sidney Shapiro. New York: Interworld Press [1972] 
Les fantoches. [Port-au-Prince?] 1931.
Gouverneurs de la rosée, roman. [Port-au-Prince: Imprimerie de l’état, 1944]
Sar ha-telalim. Translated into Hebrew. [Merhavya, 1948]
Governadores del rocío. Translated into Spanish. Habana: Impr. Nacional de Cuba [1961]
Zotër të vesës (roman). Translated into Albanian. [Tiranë]: Shtépia Botonjése Naim Frashéri [1968]
Gouverneurs de la rosée : roman. Fort-de-France [Martinique]: Désormeaux, [1979], c1977 (1983 printing)
Gouverneurs de la rosée : roman. Unité de Réghaïa, Algérie: ENAG, c1989.
Gouverneurs de la rosée. Coconut Creek, Fla.: Educa Vision Inc., [1999]. 
Masters of the dew. Gouverneurs de la rosée, translated by Langston Hughes and Mercer Cook. New York: Reynal & Hitchcock, c1947.
Masters of the dew. Gouverneurs de la rosée, translated by Langston Hughes and Mercer Cook. Oxford; Portsmouth, NH: Heinemann, [1997?], c1978. 
La montagne ensorcelée. [Port-au-Prince: S.N.E.P.] 1931.
La montagne ensorcelée. Paris: Messidor, c1987. 
La montagne ensorcelée. Paris: Éditeurs français réunis [1972]
La montagne ensorcelée: roman 4th ed. Montréal, QC: Mémoire d’encrier, 2005. 
Poèmes Port-au-Prince, Haïti: Editions des Antilles, [1993]
Poemas de una isla y de dos pueblos. With Pedro Mir, Jacques Viau. La Habana, Cuba: Casa de las Américas, 1974.
Poésies; Griefs de l’homme noir; La proie et l’ombre; La montagne ensorcelée (récit paysan) Port-au-Prince, Haïti: Editions fardin, 1998.
La proie et l’ombre. Port-au-Prince, Haïti: Éditions "La Presse" [1930]

References 
Dalleo, Raphael, Caribbean Literature and the Public Sphere: From the Plantation to the Postcolonial. Charlottesville: University of Virginia Press, 2011.
 Fowler, Carolyn, A Knot in the Thread, Howard University Press, Washington, 1980.
 
 
“The Rhetoric of Suffering, Hope, and Redemption in Masters of the Dew: A Rhetorical and Politico-Theological Analysis of Manuel as Peasant-Messiah and Redeemer” by Celucien L. Joseph  Memphis Theological Seminary Journal, 51 (2012):1-36
“Faith, Secular Humanism, and Development: A Reading of Jacques Roumain’s Religious Sensibility and Marxist Rhetoric” by Celucien L. Joseph,  Journal of Postcolonial Networks, 2012
“The Rhetoric of Suffering, Hope, and Redemption in Masters of the Dew: A Rhetorical and Politico-Theological Analysis of Manuel as Peasant-Messiah and Redeemer” by Celucien L. Joseph, Memphis Theological Seminary Journal, Volume 51 (2012):1-36. Free online access.
Joseph, Celucien L. From Toussaint to Price-Mars: Rhetoric, Race, and Religion in Haitian Thought (CreateSpace Independent Publishing Platform, 2013)

1907 births
1944 deaths
People from Port-au-Prince
Haitian communists
Haitian journalists
Haitian male novelists
Haitian people of Mulatto descent
Haitian male poets
Haitian politicians
20th-century Haitian novelists
20th-century Haitian poets
20th-century journalists
Columbia University people